Kayalıbağ is a village in the Bitlis District of Bitlis Province in Turkey. The village is populated by Kurds of the Dimilî tribe and had a population of 1 in 2021.

The hamlet of Kaşıklı is attached to the village.

Population 
Population history of the village from 2007 to 2022:

References

Villages in Bitlis District
Kurdish settlements in Bitlis Province